Ouro Verde (English: Payback) is a Portuguese telenovela broadcast and produced by TVI, written by newcomer Maria João Costa. It is recorded in Portugal and Brazil with some scenes also recorded in Madrid.

Plot

Season 1 (2017) 
"Jorge Monforte" (Diogo Morgado) is a Brazilian entrepreneur, owner of the Ouro Verde (Brazil) empire, one of the world leaders in the agricultural market. It has just acquired a significant stake in Banco Brandão Ferreira da Fonseca (BBFF), a family-owned company led by the powerful Portuguese banker "Miguel Ferreira da Fonseca" (Luís Esparteiro), winning a seat on the institution's board of directors. The novelty is not well received in the family of the banker, who suspect the real intentions of that foreigner. Jorge Monforte is the new identity of  Zé Maria Magalhães , who was killed 15 years ago and who is now returning to take justice for the death of his family.

João Magalhães (Paulo Pires), his father, was BBFF's chief financial officer when a scandal involving the bank broke out in a complicated scheme of fraud and misappropriation of capital.  John  is used as a scapegoat when accused of the coup. It begins to be investigated and his name is smeared in the newspapers. To defend himself, "John" threatens "Miguel", assuring that he will denounce all the dirty schemes of the bank if they do not get him out of that situation, and "Miguel" realizes that, alive, he is a time bomb. This results in a murderer being sent to his house to fake a suicide. It turns out that his family, who had already left by chance, surprise the killer and ends up dead, with the exception of  Zé Maria  who, miraculously, survives.

After six months in a coma,  Zé Maria  wakes up. But he's very confused about the fateful night. Miguel, on learning of the incident, is apprehensive, afraid that he will remember something that might compromise him and pretends to be worried about the boy. When  Zé Maria  decides to return to her life, she searches for  Miguel  to find work and crosses up with the murderer of her family, who does not identify immediately. On that same day, she also encounters Bia Ferreira da Fonseca (Joana de Verona), but does not know that she is the daughter of Miguel. There is love at first sight, but  Zé Maria  has other concerns because his memory returns, he joins the pieces and realizes that Miguel is the principal of the hateful crime that killed his whole family.

He quickly realizes that he is at risk of life and decides to flee, but not without being almost killed again by the murderer and, by chance of life, be saved by Bia.  Zé Maria  ends up spending a few days with her, fall in love with each other, until the boy is forced to flee away and leave for Rio de Janeiro. The two suffer greatly from the separation. Already in Brazil,  Zé Maria  is robbed and is without the contact of  Bia , losing it of sight. It is in Rio de Janeiro, in an impetus of courage, that "Zé Maria" ends up saving from a dangerous situation "Januário Cavalcantti" (Gracindo Júnior), an important colonel with vast properties in the Amazonia. This unlikely encounter will change his life, for this man, a few months later, will welcome him and help him by giving him work as a pawn on the farm.

The relationship between the two will grow, and when the colonel dies,  Zé Maria , now with a new identity,  Jorge Monforte , inherits all the fortune. Years later, more powerful than ever, thanks to the growth of the cattle and soy business, and already with a strong position in the BBFF,  Jorge  decides that it is time to return to Portugal and settle accounts with the past. Your family has to be avenged.  Jorge  wants to clear his father's name and do justice for the entire family that has died. He wants to see  Miguel Ferreira da Fonseca  in misery, with his name obscured in the newspapers. The data are released when "Jorge" is called urgently to one of his farms, where there is a strong environmental protest against the Ouro Verde group. Among the demonstrators, Jorge identifies Bia, now an environmental activist, whom he had not seen for 15 years, supposedly a tidy subject in his life. The heart of  Jorge  fires upon seeing her and he realizes that that passion is far from finished. Now how will he resolve the fact that she is the daughter of the man he is about to destroy? This is something she can never forgive, because the truth is that if Jorge destroys the Ferreira da Fonseca family in some way he will be doing with Bia the same as The banker did with  Jorge  in the past.

Seasons

Cast 
 Diogo Morgado – José Maria Magalhães (Zé Maria)/Jorge Monforte
 Joana de Verona – Beatriz Ferreira da Fonseca (Bia)
 Luís Esparteiro – Miguel Ferreira da Fonseca
 Ana Sofia Martins – Vera Andrade
 Sílvia Pfeifer – Mónica Ferreira da Fonseca
 Pedro Carvalho – Tomás Ferreira da Fonseca
 Dina Félix da Costa – Rita Ferreira da Fonseca
 Nuno Pardal – António Ferreira da Fonseca
 Susana Arrais – Jéssica Andrade
 Pedro Hossi  – Hadjalmar Andrade (Hadja)
 Manuela Couto – Amanda Nascimento
 Inês Nunes – David/Catarina Nascimento
 Fredy Costa – Tiago Andrade
 Úrsula Corona – Valéria de Scarpa
 Sofia Escobar – Inês Santiago
 Fernando Pires – Gonçalo Santiago
 Sofia Grillo – Paula Sampaio
 Vítor D'Andrade – Lúcio Sampaio
 Mafalda Marafusta – Cátia Sampaio
 Sofia Nicholson – Judite Sampaio
 José Wallenstein – Joaquim Fernandes
 Ângelo Torres – Padre Sebastião
 Zezé Motta – D. Nénem
 Pedro Lamares – Francisco Dias Pimentel
 Adriano Toloza – Edu
 Thai Anjos – Aparecida
 Bruno Cabrerizo – Laurentino da Silva
 Cassiano Carneiro – Edson
 Nuno Homem de Sá – Otelo Monteiro
 Rodrigo Paganelli – Salvador Ferreira da Fonseca
 Mónica Duarte – Mafalda Ferreira da Fonseca
 Júlia Palha – Sancha Ferreira da Fonseca
 João Correia – Bernardo Ferreira da Fonseca
 Daniela Melchior – Cláudia Andrade
 Diogo Branco – Sérgio Sampaio
 Ema Melo – Sol Santiago
 Gonçalo Oliveira – Guilherme Simões
 Sofia Franco – Nadine Santos
 Dylan Miguel – Henrique Silva
 Paulo Pires – João Magalhães
 Fernanda Diniz – Jaciara

Awards and nominations

References

2017 telenovelas
Portuguese telenovelas
2017 Portuguese television series debuts
2017 Portuguese television series endings
Televisão Independente telenovelas
Portuguese-language telenovelas